The Camden County Courthouse (or Old Camden County Courthouse) is a two-story courthouse in the US city of Woodbine, Georgia.

The courthouse was entered into the United States' National Register of Historic Places in 1980; it is a contributing building in the Woodbine Historic District, which was listed on the NRHP in 1999.

The building was designed by Julian de Bruyn Kops (1862–1942). Since its completion in 1928, it has served not only as a courthouse for Georgia's Camden County, but also as a venue for meetings, commerce, and other functions.

It was nominated for the NRHP as Georgia's only 20th-century example of Late Gothic Revival architecture. It sports a brick façade, castellated portico and parapets, and rectangular windows with crown molding.

References

External links
 

Gothic Revival architecture in Georgia (U.S. state)
Government buildings completed in 1928
Courthouses on the National Register of Historic Places in Georgia (U.S. state)
Buildings and structures in Camden County, Georgia
Former county courthouses in Georgia (U.S. state)
National Register of Historic Places in Camden County, Georgia
Historic district contributing properties in Georgia (U.S. state)